The 2017–18 Luge World Cup was a multi race tournament over a season for Luge, organised by the FIL. The season started on 18 November 2017 in Innsbruck, Austria, and ended on 27 January 2018 in Sigulda, Latvia.

Calendar

Results

Men's singles

Women's singles

Doubles

Team relay

Standings

Men's singles 

Final standings after 13 events
(*Champion 2017)

Men's singles Sprint 

Final standings after 4 events
Only 7 lugers competed on all events

Women's singles 

Final standings after 13 events
(*Champion 2017)

Women's singles Sprint 

Final standings after 4 events
(*Champion 2017)
Only 6 lugers competed on all events

Doubles 

Final standings after 13 events
(*Champion 2017)

Doubles Sprint 

Final standings after 4 events
Only 5 double sleds competed on all events

Team Relay 

Final standings after 6 events
(*Champion 2017)

Medal table

References

External links
 FIL streaming service

2017-18
2017 in luge
2018 in luge